Agathe-Sophie Sasserno (3 October 1810 – 6 June 1860) was a French poet. She was born in Nice and spent her life there. Although she wrote in French, she considered herself Italian.

Life

Agathe-Sophie Sasserno was born in 1810 at the place Victor (today the place Garibaldi) in Nice.
She was the daughter of Lieutenant Colonel Louis Sasserno, a former aide of André Masséna, and Marie Sibille Chartroux.
She was a cousin of the painter Giovanni Battista Biscarra.
She wrote her first poem at the age of fourteen to distract her father.
According to Jean-Baptiste Toselli, she received much praise for this, which encouraged her to continue.
She remained single all her life and devoted herself entirely to poetry.

Although she wrote in French she considered herself Italian so she dedicated her work Les Sylphides (1838) to King Charles Albert of Sardinia.
She later wrote Ore meste, chants sur l'Italie (1846), and the collection Poésies françaises d'une Italienne in 1854 for which the critic Charles Augustin Sainte-Beuve wrote the preface.
She was enthusiastic about the ongoing unification of Italy. 
In 'Glorie e Sventure : chants de guerre de l'indépendance italienne (1852) she evoked Anita Garibaldi.

Her attachment to Nice, which she calls her homeland, is also a recurring theme in her poems.
She writes of it in Nice (1858) "Oh Nice, oh my country Nice, oh sweet natal soil, oh my Nice so beautiful".
In Tears and Smiles (1856) six poems are devoted to Nice.
One entitled Physionomies nationales describes several regional costumes, of which two are of the Land of Nice.
In À Catherine Ségurane she celebrates the heroism of Catherine Ségurane, the washerwoman of Nice.

During her life, she corresponded with several French writers including Alphonse de Lamartine, Alexandre Dumas, Victor Hugo and François-René de Chateaubriand.
She was a corresponding member of the Academy of Sciences, Arts and Belles Lettres of Lyon.
She is buried in the cemetery of the castle.
A square and a private school are named after her in Nice.

Works

Notes

Sources

1810 births
1860 deaths
French women poets
Romantic poets
19th-century French writers
19th-century women writers